The 2014 Shanghai Greenland Shenhua season was Shanghai Greenland Shenhua's 11th season in the Chinese Super League and 52nd overall in the Chinese top flight. They also competed in the Chinese FA Cup, reaching the Semi-Finals.

Squad
Updated 27 June 2014.

Reserve squad

Transfers

Winter

In:

Out:

Summer

In:

Out:

Competitions

Chinese Super League

Results summary

Results

Table

Chinese FA Cup

Squad statistics

Appearances and goals

|-
|colspan="14"|Players who away from the club on loan:

|-
|colspan="14"|Players who appeared for Shanghai Greenland Shenhua who left during the season:

|}

Goal scorers

References

Shanghai Shenhua F.C. seasons
Shanghai Greenland Shenhua F.C.